| lowest attendance = 128 Cinderford at home to Old Albanian on 8 November
| tries = {{#expr:
 + 6 + 7 + 5 + 6 + 8 + 5 + 8 + 3
  + 7 + 5 + 5 + 7 + 10 + 7 + 8 + 6
  + 6 + 10 + 5 + 5 + 8 + 11 + 5 + 5
  + 8 + 4 + 7 + 8 + 5 + 7 + 8 + 4
  + 5 + 5 + 11 + 7 +6  + 11 + 6 + 7
  + 9 + 1 + 6 + 8 + 12 + 4 + 5 + 10
  + 7 + 6 + 11 + 12 + 7 + 13 + 9 + 11
  + 8 + 2 + 10 + 7 + 6 + 4 + 9 + 9
  + 5 + 12 + 5 + 9 + 10 + 9 + 5 + 5
  + 6 + 1 + 4 + 3 + 5 + 5 + 6 + 7
  + 4 + 8 + 8 + 6 + 6 + 17 + 5 + 3
  + 12 + 6 + 6 + 8 + 8 + 10 + 5 + 11
  + 5 + 6 + 7 + 9 + 8 + 6 + 6 + 7
  + 7 + 8 + 3 + 13 + 7 + 10 + 8 + 7
  + 6 + 5 + 7 + 7 + 11 + 7 + 4
  + 2 + 6 + 7 + 11 + 8 + 9 + 9 + 10
  + 6 + 3 + 7 + 2 + 6 + 5 + 5 + 4
  + 3 + 10 + 6 + 6 + 7 + 14 + 10 + 9
  + 10 + 3 + 3 + 7 + 6 + 9 + 4 + 7
  + 6 + 6 + 6 + 4 + 6 + 15 + 7 + 6
  + 7 + 5 + 4 + 7 + 10 + 4 + 7
  + 6 + 3 + 4 + 6 + 8 + 5 + 6 + 5
  + 7 + 8 + 4 + 9 + 6 + 6 + 4 + 6
  + 9 + 6 + 5 + 5 + 7 + 9 + 3 + 7
 + 1 + 8
  + 8 + 5 + 5 + 7 + 6 + 8 + 7 +6
  + 8 + 7 + 9 + 12 + 8 + 12 + 7 + 8
  + 7 + 7 + 6 + 6 + 8 + 2 + 8 + 8
  + 9 + 3 + 6 + 10 + 6 + 14 + 9 + 6
 + 11 + 10 + 3 + 5 + 9 + 11 + 9 + 6

}}
| top point scorer =  Rob Kirby (Richmond) 270  
| top try scorer   =  Phil Chesters (Ealing Trailfinders) 33
| prevseason       = 2013–14
| nextseason       = 2015–16
}}

The 2014–15 National League 1, known for sponsorship reasons as the SSE National League 1 is the sixth season of the third tier of the English domestic rugby union competitions, since the professionalised format of the second tier RFU Championship was introduced; and is the twenty-eighth season since league rugby began in 1987. Ealing Trailfinders are the champions and return to the 2015–16 RFU Championship following their relegation from that league last season. The last three clubs are relegated; Old Albanian to National League 2 South, and Tynedale and Macclesfield to National League 2 North

Structure
The league consists of sixteen teams with all the teams playing each other on a home and away basis to make a total of thirty matches each. There is one promotion place and three relegation places. The champions are promoted to the Greene King IPA Championship and the bottom three teams are relegated to either National League 2 North or National League 2 South depending on the geographical location of the team.

Participating teams and locations

Twelve of the sixteen teams participated in last season's competition. The 2013–14 champions Doncaster Knights were promoted to the RFU Championship and are replaced by Ealing Trailfinders who only spent one season in the league above. The three relegated teams were all promoted in 2012–13 and stayed one season in National League 1; Henley Hawks and Worthing Raiders are relegated to National League 2 South and Hull Ionians to National League 2 North. The promoted teams are Hartpury College and Macclesfield champions of National League 2 South and National League 2 North respectively, and Darlington Mowden Park who won the promotion play-off against Ampthill & District.

League table

Fixtures

Round 1

Round 2

Round 3

Round 4

Round 5

Round 6

Round 7

Round 8

Round 9

Round 10

Round 11

Round 12

Round 13

Round 14

Round 15

Round 16

Round 17

Round 18

Round 19

Round 20

Round 21

Round 22

Round 23

Round 24

Postponed matches

Round 25

Round 26

Round 27

Round 28

Round 29

Round 30

Season records

Team
Largest home win — 66 pts
78 – 12 Ealing Trailfinders at home to Wharfedale on 10 January
Largest away win — 47 pts
0 – 47 Fylde away to Macclesfield on 13 September
Most points scored — 78
78 – 12 Ealing Trailfinders at home to Wharfedale on 10 January
Most tries in a match — 12
78 – 12 Ealing Trailfinders at home to Wharfedale on 10 January
Most conversions in a match — 9
Ealing Trailfinders at home to Macclesfield on 18 October
Ealing Trailfinders at home to Wharfedale on 10 January
Ealing Trailfinders at home to Richmond on 24 January
Most penalties in a match — 6
Hartbury College home to Esher on 4 October
Blackheath away to Wharfedale on 11 October
Most drop goals in a match — 1 
N/A - multiple teams

Player
Most points in a match — 25
Chris Davis for Richmond away to Hartbury College on 20 September
Ben Frankland for Tynedale away to Macclesfield on 11 October
Matthew Jones for Coventry away to Rosslyn Park on 25 April
Most tries in a match — 5
Chris Davis for Richmond away to Hartbury College on 20 September
Ben Frankland for Tynedale away to Macclesfield on 11 October
Most conversions in a match — 9
Matt Jarvis for Ealing Trailfinders at home to Macclesfield on 18 October
Ben Ward for Ealing Trailfinders at home to Wharfedale on 10 January
Most penalties in a match — 6
Gareth Thompson for Hartbury College home to Esher on 4 October
Alex Gallagher for Blackheath away to Wharfedale on 11 October
Most drop goals in a match — 1 
N/A - multiple players

Attendances
Highest — 2,278
Ealing Trailfinders at home to Rosslyn Park on 18 April
Lowest — 128
Cinderford at home to Old Albanian on 8 November
Highest Average Attendance — 1,506
Coventry
Lowest Average Attendance — 308				
Macclesfield

Average attendances

Leading scorers

Leading points scorers

Top try scorers

References

External links
 NCA Rugby

National
National League 1 seasons